Daryna Maxymets (28 October 1956) is a Ukrainian journalist, publisher, head of the Association of Business Women of Bukovina, Honored Journalist of Ukraine (2002), and director of the publishing house "Bukrek" (Chernivtsi). She lives and works in Chernivtsi.

Biography 
Daryna Maxymets was born on October 28, 1956 in the village of Potelych, Zhovkva Raion, Lviv Oblast.

Her husband is Mykola Maxymets, editor-in-chief of Bukrek and writer.

References

External links 
 Daryna Maxymets on Lviv Book Forum 2017
 

1956 births
Living people
Ukrainian journalists
Ukrainian women journalists
University of Lviv alumni
Businesspeople from Chernivtsi
Writers from Chernivtsi